Acalolepta boninensis is a species of beetle in the family Cerambycidae. It was described by Hayashi in 1971.

References

Acalolepta
Beetles described in 1971